Richard Vernon Andree (16 December 1919 – 8 May 1987) was an American mathematician and computer scientist.

Andree taught at the University of Oklahoma for 37 years, and served as a professor emeritus there until his death. He and his wife, Josephine, founded the Mu Alpha Theta mathematics honor society.  Andree wrote a book on abstract algebra entitled Selections From Modern Abstract Algebra which was first published in 1958.   He also wrote and published at his own expense numerous puzzle books and enjoyed cryptography.  Andree and his students developed the ALPS programming language for the Bendix G-15 computer.

For several years in the late 1960s and thru the 1970s, Andree ran a summer school for high school teachers in Oklahoma to expose them to computers.  Teachers would come from around the state and take short courses in programming in FORTRAN or BASIC. He also held evening and night computer study labs for local business owners wanting an exposure to computers and how they could use them in their business.

Andree was influential in the national collegiate mathematical organization Pi Mu Epsilon, having served as President, Secretary-Treasurer, and editor of their Journal. The Richard V. Andree Awards are given by the organization to undergraduates whose articles in the Pi Mu Epsilon Journal have been judged as containing the best content for the year.

References

External links
 Data from the Information Age Education

1919 births
1987 deaths
Writers from Michigan
20th-century American mathematicians
American computer scientists
Place of birth missing
University of Oklahoma faculty